Over the Border, also known as South of the Border, is a 2006 South Korean melodrama film. It is Ahn Pan-seok's feature film directorial debut.

Plot
Kim Sun-ho is a horn player for the Mansoodae Art Company, Pyongyang's state orchestra. He comes from a well-to-do family in North Korea and is about to marry his sweetheart, War Memorial guide, Lee Yeon-Hwa. One day, Sun-ho's family receives a letter from his grandfather in Seoul, whom they had thought was dead. They begin to exchange letters, but when the authorities discover their correspondence, this puts the Kim family in grave danger. They decide to flee North Korea and defect to the South, where they are initially penniless and friendless. Devastated that he had to leave Yeon-Hwa behind, Sun-ho works hard to save enough money to help her escape North Korea and join him. But one day, news reaches him that Yeon-Hwa has married another man. Slowly he emerges from his heartbreak and despair to find a way to adapt to life in the South, and eventually marries a kind South Korean woman named Seo Kyung-Joo. But his peaceful life is again disrupted when he learns that Yeon-Hwa has defected to the South, and contrary to what he had heard, she isn't married at all.

Cast
Cha Seung-won as Kim Sun-ho
Jo Yi-jin as Lee Yeon-Hwa
Shim Hye-jin as Seo Kyung-Joo
Song Jae-ho as Sun-ho's father
Won Mi-won as Sun-ho's mother
Yoo Hae-jin as Sun-ho's brother-in-law
Lee Ah-hyun as Sun-ae
Kim Cheol-Yong as Guide
Jo Mun-Ui as Broker
Lee Sang-Ju as Conductor
Park Hyuk-kwon as Detective in charge of Yeon-Hwa
Son Jin-ho as Photographer
Boom as Reporter
Choi Dae-Woong as Grandfather
Yang Ji-Woong as Driver
Gu Bon-Im as a Chinese restaurant owner
Kim Sang-ho as Drunk (cameo)
Son Beom-soo as Announcer (cameo)

Awards and nominations

References

External links
 

2006 films
South Korean drama films
Films about North Korea–South Korea relations
Films about North Korean defectors
2000s South Korean films